The Rastrick Independent School was a private school in Rastrick in the Metropolitan Borough of Calderdale, West Yorkshire, England.  Opened in 1994 the school closed at very short notice in August 2019.

The school had a capacity of 482 pupils but only had around 70 enrolled at the time of its closure.

References

Defunct schools in Calderdale
Educational institutions established in 1994
1994 establishments in England
Educational institutions disestablished in 2019
2019 disestablishments in England